Forde House, now also known as Old Forde House, is a Grade I listed Jacobean former manor house in Newton Abbot, Devon, England. Once the manor house of the parish of Wolborough, it is now absorbed into a suburb of Newton Abbot. The south front is clearly visible from the busy Brunel Road which cuts across the house's front lawn.

History

Reynell

The present house was built by Sir Richard Reynell (d.1633), Member of Parliament for Mitchell in Cornwall (1593) and his wife Lucy Brandon and was probably completed in about 1610, according to the date on the rainwater heads. The house was built with an E-shaped floor plan, which may have been in honour of Queen Elizabeth I, who had recently died. The grounds were originally extensive, and included the whole of what is called Decoy (so named, because wildfowl were decoyed there to extend the house's larder), as well as a deer park.

On 15 September 1625 King Charles I stayed at the house overnight on his way to Plymouth, to inspect the fleet.  He returned a few days later and stayed for a further two nights.

During the Civil War, Forde House gave shelter to Oliver Cromwell and Colonel Fairfax on 24 January 1646 before the second Siege of Exeter.

Courtenay

In 1648 the estate passed to the Courtenay family  via the marriage of Margaret Waller (d.1694), only daughter and heiress of Sir William Waller by his wife Jane Reynell, the heiress of Forde, to Sir William Courtenay, 1st Baronet (1628-1702), of Powderham Castle. Powderham Castle had been badly damaged during the Civil War and Forde became the Courtenay's principal residence. Both the 1st baronet and his wife Margaret Waller were buried at Wolborough.

William of Orange stayed at the house in 1688 on the way to his coronation in London, having landed in Brixham a few days earlier. The Courtenays soon moved back to a restored Powderham Castle, where in particular William Courtenay, 1st Viscount Courtenay (1711-1762), the great-grandson of Margaret Waller, effected a major remodelling. Forde House however remained a possession of the Courtenays until 1762 when the house was let to a succession of occupiers.

Tenants post 1762

Wise

In 1820 Forde House was let to Ayshford Wise (1786-1847), JP, DL and MP for Totnes 1812-1818, descended from the ancient Devon family of Wise of Sydenham House. His co-member for Totnes was Thomas Courtenay (d.1841), younger brother of William Courtenay, 10th Earl of Devon (1777–1859), of Powderham.  The Wise family were lord of the manor of Little Totnes, and his father John Wise (1751-1807) of Wonwell was Recorder of Totnes from 1779 until his death and a partner in the "Totnes Bank", founded in about 1800 as Wise, Baker & Co. In 1817 the bank opened a new branch in Newton Abbot and in 1820 Ayshford Wise sold Wonwell and rented Forde House to be near his new premises. Later in the 1820s he sold his ancestral lands in Totnes to  Edward Adolphus St Maur, 11th Duke of Somerset (1775–1855), of Stover House, who owned a great estate in and around Totnes the caput of which was Berry Pomeroy Castle. The bank failed in 1841.

Sellick

The Courtenay family sold the house in 1936 to Stephen Simpson, who sold it two years later to a Mrs M. Sellick who ran a business from it. In the 1950s she negotiated to convey the property to the National Trust, but the transaction was not completed.

Teignbridge District Council
Teignbridge District Council bought the house from the Sellick family in 1978 and remain the current owners.  It has been refurbished by the Council and is now used as office and conference space as well as being used for weddings and other events.

Description
The main hall of the house is traditionally located to the west of the main entrance and has a notable plaster ceiling depicting sprays of several different flowers and fruits. The dining room, which was formerly the library, has a similarly-decorated ceiling, as does the Chairman's parlour, which also has a fine fireplace. The Long Room, also known as the Great Chamber, is on the first floor and is one of the best great chambers surviving in south west England.

Today, the house lies to the east side of the town of Newton Abbot, near the Penn Inn roundabout at the junction of the A380 and the A381 roads. Its former large grounds have been reduced to a grassed area between the house and the busy Brunel Road.

References

Sources

Grade I listed buildings in Devon
Newton Abbot